The International School of Siem Reap (ISSR) is a private, International School in Siem Reap, Cambodia. It accepts both expats and local Khmer students - full fee paying and sponsored students. It is the largest international primary and secondary school in Siem Reap.

Curriculum 
The International School of Siem Reap (ISSR) has over 300 students aged between 2 and 18 years from over 20 nationalities. The school adheres to the British National curriculum National Curriculum (England, Wales and Northern Ireland) in primary school and the Cambridge Assessment International Education (CAIE or simply Cambridge) International General Certificate of Secondary Education IGCSE curriculum in high school (secondary school). For local Khmer students who wish to attend university in Cambodia ISSR provides a dual curriculum of both Khmer and British curriculum allowing for matriculation in both. French and Chinese modern foreign languages are offered within the school curriculum.

Accreditation 
ISSR The International School of Siem Reap is fully accredited by Cambridge International Examinations and offers IGCSE International General Certificate of Secondary Education exams.

Location 
ISSR is split into two campuses. The high school recently re-located to the previous Primary school building on Sala Lodge Road near the ring road. A new Infants and primary school campus was constructed and opened in August 2019 and is located on the Ring Road, Kor Kranh, near the Siem Reap River on the western side.

References

Schools in Cambodia
International schools in Cambodia
Cambridge schools in Cambodia